Canal de Berdún (in Aragonese: A Canal de Berdún) is a municipality located in the province of Huesca, Aragon, Spain. According to the 2004 census (INE), the municipality had a population of 401 inhabitants, which had dropped to 321 by 2018.

Villages
Berdún, the capital of the municipality
Biniés
 Huértalo
 Majones
 Martes
 Villarreal de la Canal

References

Municipalities in the Province of Huesca